Hmong Churches are churches of the China-based Hmong people. Hmong Churches tend to be Renewal churches.

History
The first missionaries to Laos were from the Netherlands. At that time, Laos was a French protectorate within French Indochina, governed by King Souligna Vongsa. In 1947, Rev. Ted Andrianoff and his wife sailed from New York to Laos to do missionary work for the Christian and Missionary Alliance. The majority of the people who converted to Christianity at that time were the Khmu and the Hmong people who spoke Green Hmong. They accepted their first convert in 1950. By March 1951, 2,300 Laotian Hmong had converted to Christianity; four years later the number was 5,000.

When Laos fell during the Vietnam War, thousands of Christian Hmong were evacuated and resettled in the United States.

List of Hmong Church Organizations
 Alliance Churches of the Christian and Missionary Alliance https://www.hmongdistrict.org/
 Hmong Baptist National Association https://www.hbna.org/
 United Christians Liberty Evangelical
 Oroville Hmong Alliance Church
 Hmong Faith Alliance Church of La Crosse, WI
 Emmanuel Alliance Church of Galesville, WI
 Coon Rapids Hmong Alliance Church  Coon Rapids, Minnesota

See also
 Hmong folk religion
 Hmong Americans
 Hmong people
 Hmong customs and culture
 Kingdom of Laos

References

Protestantism in China
Hmong culture